Brilliantine  is a hair-grooming product intended to soften men's hair, including beards and moustaches, and give it a glossy, well-groomed appearance.  It was created at the turn of the 20th century by French perfumer Édouard Pinaud (a.k.a. Ed. Pinaud). In English-speaking markets Pinaud's name is associated with the Clubman tradename in men's toiletries.  He presented a product he called Brillantine (from the French  meaning "brilliant") at the 1900 Exposition Universelle in Paris. It consisted of a perfumed and colored oily liquid.

Brillantine was used as the French title for the film Grease in Quebec, Canada.

See also
 Brylcreem
 Hair conditioner
 Pomade
 Macassar oil

References

Hair care products
Products introduced in 1900